Pericles A. Mitkas (born 1962 in Florina, Greece) is a Greek university lecturer in electronic and computer engineering. He holds American as well as Greek nationality and is Rector of the Aristotle University of Thessaloniki (AUTH). He was elected as President of both the Black Sea Universities Network and the Balkan Universities Network from 2018 to 2020.

Life and work 
Mitkas studied at the AUTH and obtained a Diploma as  Elektroingenieur (Electrical Engineer) in 1985. In 1987 he obtained a master's degree in Computer Engineering at Syracuse University in the US state of New York,  and a Ph.D. in 1990 at the same university with a dissertation titled ː On Relational Database Operations Implemented in Optics.

Mitkas became Assistant Professor in 1990 and an Associate professor in 1996 at Syracuse University and was at the same time was Visiting Professor at the AUTH. In 1999 he returned to the AUTH and took over the Department of Electrical and Computer Engineering as Professor.  He also took over a number administrative posts at this university and from 2010 until 2014 was a member of its Senate. He was elected its Rector in 2014.

Mitkas is married to Sophia Mardiri and has two children.

Main works (selection) 
 Parallel Computer Architecture for Large Data Volumes and their Analysis 
 Software User and Multiple User Systems 
 Data Gapture and Evaluation Systems 
 Multi-User Systems for Ecological Management 
 Parallel Evaluation Systems for Large Volumes of Biological Data 
 Semantic Scientific Evaluation of Texts in the Internet

Memberships (selection) 
 Senior Member of IEEE and the IEEE Computer Society
 Optical Society of America (OSA)
 Society for Photooptical Instrumentation Engineering (SPIE)
 SPIE Working Group on Optical Processing & Computing and of the SPIE Working Group on Holography
 Association of Computing Machinery (ACM)
 Hellenic Society of Computational Biology and Bioinformatics
 Technical Chamber of Greece

External links 
 Literature by and about Pericles A. Mitkas in the catalogue of the German National Library
 Pericles A. Mitkas on the Web Pages of the AUTH
 Publication List of Pericles A. Mitkas

References 

Living people
Academic staff of the Aristotle University of Thessaloniki
1962 births
Syracuse University faculty
Heads of universities and colleges in Greece